The Soap Creek School, located near Corvallis, Oregon, United States, is listed on the National Register of Historic Places.

See also
 National Register of Historic Places listings in Benton County, Oregon

References

1932 establishments in Oregon
Bungalow architecture in Oregon
National Register of Historic Places in Benton County, Oregon
School buildings completed in 1932
School buildings on the National Register of Historic Places in Oregon
Schools in Benton County, Oregon